Kangaroo Lake State Natural Area is a nature sanctuary in Door County, Wisconsin, United States, located on and around Kangaroo Lake. The land was designated a State Natural Area in 2002. Home to the endangered Hine's Emerald Dragonfly, it has the largest breeding population of the dragonfly in the world. The area also provides recreational activities for the public.


Species

Many species of plants, mammals, birds, and fish inhabit Kangaroo Lake State Natural Area.

Plants and trees 

White cedar
Black ash
Tamarack
Balsam fir
Speckled alder
Willow
Meadowsweet
Canada yew
Starflower
Sugar maple
Iris

Birds and mammals 

Bald eagle
Black tern
Caspian tern
White-tailed deer
Canada goose

Insects 

Hine's Emerald Dragonfly
copper butterfly

Fish 

Bluegill
Largemouth bass
Northern pike
Smallmouth bass
Walleye

Gallery

References

External links
 Kangaroo Lake State Natural Area

Protected areas established in 2002
Protected areas of Door County, Wisconsin
State Natural Areas of Wisconsin
2002 establishments in Wisconsin